The Swiss Senior Curling Championships are the national championships of men's and women's senior curling teams in Switzerland. Senior level curlers must be over the age of 50. The championships have been held annually since 1973 for senior men and since 2003 for senior women. The championships are organized by the Swiss Curling Association.

Men

Champions

Champions and medallists
Team line-ups shows in order: fourth, third, second, lead, alternate, coach; skips marked bold.

Women

Champions

Champions and medallists
Team line-ups shows in order: fourth, third, second, lead, alternate, coach; skips marked bold.

References

External links
Archiv - Swisscurling
Swiss Curling Association Champions
Erfolge des Curling Club Dübendorf

See also
Swiss Men's Curling Championship
Swiss Women's Curling Championship
Swiss Mixed Doubles Curling Championship
Swiss Mixed Curling Championship
Swiss Wheelchair Curling Championship
Swiss Junior Curling Championships

Curling competitions in Switzerland
National curling championships
1973 establishments in Switzerland
2003 establishments in Switzerland
Recurring sporting events established in 1973
Recurring sporting events established in 2003
Annual sporting events in Switzerland

National youth sports competitions
Senior curling